Yatsuka may refer to:

Yatsuka District, Shimane, a former district in Shimane Prefecture, Japan
Yatsuka, Shimane, a former town in Yatsuka District, Shimane Prefecture, Japan
Yatsuka, Okayama, a former town in Maniwa District, Okayama Prefecture, Japan
Yatsuka Station, a railway station in Sōka, Saitama Prefecture, Japan
7097 Yatsuka, a main-belt asteroid

People with the given name
, Japanese political scientist